Compound butters (pl. beurres composés) are mixtures of butter and supplementary ingredients.  Primarily, they are used to enhance flavor in various dishes, in a fashion similar to a sauce.

Compound butters can be made at home or purchased commercially.    A compound butter can be made by whipping additional elements, such as herbs, spices or aromatic liquids, into butter.  The butter is then reformed, usually in plastic wrap or parchment paper, and chilled until it is firm enough to be sliced.  These butters can be melted on top of meats and vegetables, used as a spread or used to finish various sauces.

Beurres composés include:
 Beurre à la bourguignonne – garlic and parsley butter
 Beurre Maitre d'Hotel, butter with parsley and lemon juice
 Café de Paris butter
 Garlic butter
 Beurre au citron – lemon butter

References

External links
 

Butter
French sauces
Steak sauces